The Lumapanel is a motion picture light designed in the 1990s.  It uses new-technology ballasts to drive 28  fluorescent bulbs resulting in a low-power, high-output computer-controlled fixture. It is used by various Hollywood cinematographers.

Projects
 Iron Man (2008)
 Pursuit of Happyness (2007)
 Smokin' Aces (2007)
 Live Free or DieHard (2007)
 Next (2007)
 Blades of Glory (2007)
 Freedom Writers (2006)
 RV (2006)
 You, Me and Dupree (2006)
 NEXT (2006)
 #23 (2006)
 Fast and Furious III (2006)
 Fun with Dick and Jane (2006)
 Smokin' Aces (2006)
 When a Stranger Calls (2006)
 Madonna (2005)
 War of the Worlds (2005)
 The Terminal (2004)
 Matchbox Twenty Concert Tour (2002)
 Catch Me If You Can (2002)
 Minority Report (2002)
 Artificial Intelligence: AI (2001)
 98° Concert Tour (2000)

External links
 http://www.lumapanel.com/
 https://web.archive.org/web/20070927001834/http://www.ascmag.com/magazine_dynamic/July2007/DieHard4/page1.php
 http://www.theasc.com/magazine/jan03/karma/index.html

Cinematography